A bed burial is a type of burial in which the deceased person is buried in the ground, lying upon a bed.  It is a burial custom that is particularly associated with high-status women during the early Anglo-Saxon period (7th century), although excavated examples of bed burials are comparatively rare.

Anglo-Saxon bed burials

A number of early Anglo-Saxon bed burials, almost all dating to the 7th century, have been found in England, predominantly in the southern counties of Cambridgeshire, Suffolk and Wiltshire, but single examples have also been found in Derbyshire and North Yorkshire.  The beds used in these burials were made of wood, and although none have been fully preserved, their presence can be inferred from the presence of iron fixtures and fittings, such as nails, cleats, grommets, brackets, headboard mounts and railings, that outline the rectangular shape of the bed in the grave.  However, in some cases it is not clear whether the iron fixtures found in a grave come from a bed or a coffin.

The majority of the Anglo-Saxon bed burials are for young women, and many of the burials include items of jewellery and other grave goods that indicate that the dead person must have been wealthy and of high status during life.  The high quality of the gold jewellery found in the bed burial at Loftus in Yorkshire suggests that the occupant of the grave may have been a princess.  On the other hand, some of the young women buried on their beds have pectoral crosses or other Christian emblems buried with them (Ixworth, Roundway Down, Swallowcliffe Down, Trumpington), which has suggested the possibility that they may have been abbesses, who in the early Anglo-Saxon period were recruited from noble families.

In addition to laying the deceased on a bed, some of the bed burials exhibit other features that mark them out as special, and relate them to ship burials, such as the bed being placed in a chamber (Coddenham, Swallowcliffe Down), or a barrow being raised above the grave (Lapwing Hill, Swallowcliffe Down).  In at least two sites (Loftus and Trumpington), a grubenhaus (sunken floored building) has been excavated close to the bed burial, and it is possible that the deceased was laid out in the grubenhaus before burial so that mourners could pay their respects to her.

The complex and elaborate funeral practices that must have been associated with a bed burial have been well described by archaeologist Howard Williams:

Interring the deceased on a bed suggests that sleep was seen as a metaphor for death.  Furthermore, the Old English word leger (modern English lair), literally meaning a "place where one lies", was used to refer to both beds and graves in Old English literature, which emphasizes the symbolic equivalence of the bed and the grave.

List of Anglo-Saxon bed burials
About a dozen Anglo-Saxon bed burials, as well as several possible bed burials, have been excavated from the 19th century onwards, as listed in the table below.

Viking bed burials
In several Viking ship burials from Norway and Sweden, including the Oseberg ship burial (dated to 834) and Gokstad ship burial (dated to the late 9th century), the deceased had been laid out on beds.  However, true bed burials, in which the bed is buried directly in the ground are not known.

Modern instances 
In 1910, Morris Lofton was buried in Rose Cemetery of Tarpon Springs, Florida, in his iron bed frame, his only possession. It can still be seen in the cemetery today.

See also
 Chamber tomb

Footnotes

References

External links
 Artist's reconstruction of the bed burial at Collingbourne Ducis
 Pictures of the bed burial and associated grave goods at Trumpington
 Picture of the pectoral cross from the bed burial at Ixworth

Anglo-Saxon burial practices
Archaeological features
Burials
Death customs